Robert James Gonya (June 15, 1910 – c. 1999) was an American football offensive tackle who played in the National Football League. He played for two seasons with the Philadelphia Eagles from 1933–1934. He played college football at Northwestern.

Professional career

Philadelphia Eagles
In 1934, Gonya caught a four-yard touchdown pass from Dan Barnhardt against the Pittsburgh Pirates. Gonya was the only offensive lineman in Philadelphia Eagles history to catch a touchdown pass until 74 years later when Todd Herremans caught a one-yard touchdown pass from Donovan McNabb in 2008 against the Seattle Seahawks. Herremans caught another touchdown pass in 2010.

References

1910 births
1999 deaths
Players of American football from Chicago
American football offensive tackles
Northwestern Wildcats football players
Philadelphia Eagles players